Kempaiah IPS is a 1993 Indian Kannada film,  directed by V. Somashekhar and produced by L. Ravindra. The film stars Shashikumar, Tiger Prabhakar, Rambha and Srishanthi in the lead roles. The film has musical score by Hamsalekha.

Cast

Shashikumar
Tiger Prabhakar
Rambha
Srishanthi
Sadashiva Saliyan
Avinash
Sathyajit
Dingri Nagaraj
M. S. Karanth
Circus Boranna
Thipatur Raghu
Bangalore Nagesh
Lakshman
Sarigama Viji
B. K. Shankar
Go Ra Bheema Rao
Mico Seetharam
Sampangi
Agro Chikkanna
Naganna
Omprakash
Mohan
Ramananda
Pruthviraj
Krishne Gowda
Vasanth Kunigal
Srishailan
Rathnakar
Shanthamma
Navaneetha
Maddur Manjula
Hema
Saroja Shetty
T. N. Balakrishna
Mukyamanthri Chandru
Manu
Doddanna
Pramila Joshai

References

External links

1993 films
1990s Kannada-language films
Films scored by Hamsalekha
Films directed by V. Somashekhar